Jim Galloway was a Canadian soccer player who played as a forward at the international level with Canada.

Career 
Galloway played in the Inter-City League in 1925 with Toronto Scottish. He shortly joined Boston Soccer Club to play in the American Soccer League. In 1927, he played in the National Soccer League with Toronto Ulster United. Throughout his tenure with Toronto he would secure the Ontario Cup in 1927, and 1929.  In 1932, he participated in the NSL Championship final where Toronto defeated Montreal Carsteel for the title.

In 1935, he played in the Rochester Inter-City League with Kodak Park.

Managerial career 
In 1939, he was the head coach for England United in the National Soccer League, and secured the Ontario Cup in 1940.

International career 
Galloway made his debut for the Canada men's national soccer team on June 27, 1925 against United States in a friendly match.

References 

Canadian soccer coaches
Canada men's international soccer players
Canadian soccer players
Canadian expatriate soccer players
Expatriate soccer players in the United States
Canadian expatriate sportspeople in the United States
Toronto Scottish players
Toronto Ulster United players
American Soccer League (1921–1933) players
Canadian National Soccer League players
Canadian National Soccer League coaches
Association footballers not categorized by position